Qian Qihu (born October 1937) is a Chinese military engineer. He is a member of the Chinese Academy of Engineering and winner of the Highest Science and Technology Award.

Biography
Qian was born in October 1937 in Kunshan, Jiangsu, after the Imperial Japanese Army occupied Shanghai. He enlisted in the People's Liberation Army in 1954 and joined the Communist Party of China in 1956. After graduating from the PLA Military Institute of Engineering (now National University of Defense Technology) in 1960, he was sent abroad to study at the Gubischev Military Engineering Institute at the expense of the Chinese government. When he returned to China he became a teacher at the PLA Engineering Corps Institute. 

Qian was elected a fellow Chinese Academy of Engineering in 1994. Qian attained the rank of major general (shaojiang) in 1988.

In 1993 he was elected a member of the 8th National Committee of the Chinese People's Political Consultative Conference. He was a delegate to the 12th National Congress of the Communist Party of China.

In 2003 he was elected director-general of the Chinese Society for Rock Mechanics & Engineering (CSRME) and vice-president of the International Society for Rock Mechanics (ISRM). 

On January 8, 2019, he was awarded the Highest Science and Technology Award, China's top science award, at the Great Hall of the People in Beijing.

Personal life
Qian married Yuan Hui.

Awards
 1987 First Prize of the National Civil Air Defense Science and Technology Progress Award
 1990 Third Prize of the National Science and Technology Progress Award
 1998 Second Prize of the National Science and Technology Progress Award
 2011 First Prize of the National Science and Technology Progress Award
 2013 Science and Technology Award of the Ho Leung Ho Lee Foundation
 2019 Highest Science and Technology Award

References

1937 births
Living people
Scientists from Suzhou
National University of Defense Technology alumni
Members of the Chinese Academy of Engineering
People's Liberation Army generals from Jiangsu
Engineers from Jiangsu
People from Kunshan